Zehak County is in Sistan and Baluchestan province, Iran. The capital of the county is the city of Zehak. At the 2006 census, the county's population was 70,839 in 14,683 households. The following census in 2011 counted 75,419 people in 17,849 households. At the 2016 census, the county's population was 74,896 in 20,055 households.

Administrative divisions

The population history of Zehak County's administrative divisions over three consecutive censuses is shown in the following table. The latest census shows two districts, four rural districts, and one city.

References

 

Counties of Sistan and Baluchestan Province